Federico Valle (5 September 1907 – 12 February 1993) was a Puerto Rican sports shooter. He competed in the trap event at the 1956 Summer Olympics.

References

External links
 

1907 births
1993 deaths
Puerto Rican male sport shooters
Olympic shooters of Puerto Rico
Shooters at the 1956 Summer Olympics
Place of birth missing